Northern Persia at the time when the Muslim conquests started included Tabaristan, the greater portion of historic Armenia, Caucasian Albania, and Iberia. 

Sassanid Albania fell to the Islamic conquest of Persia in the mid-7th century and was incorporated into the Rashidun Caliphate. King Javanshir of Albania, the most prominent ruler of Mihranid dynasty, fought against the Arab invasion of caliph Uthman on the side of Sassanid Iran. Facing the threat of the Arab invasion on the south and the Khazar offensive on the north, Javanshir had to recognize the caliph's suzerainty. The Arabs then reunited the territory with Armenia under one governor.

The first Arab incursions in present-day Georgia happened approximately between 642 and 645, during the Muslim conquest of Persia. It soon turned into a full-scale invasion, and Tbilisi was taken in 645. The Emirate of Tbilisi was then established.

References

6th-century conflicts
Military history of Armenia
Military history of Georgia (country)
Military history of Azerbaijan
Muslim conquest of Persia